This is a Spark of Life is an EP by American crossover thrash/metalcore band Zombie Apocalypse, released on October 14, 2003. This album has more crossover thrash elements than its predecessor.

Track listing
 "Prologue: Forthcoming Apocalypse"
 "Morti Viventi"
 "Red, Black, And Blue"
 "The Dead in the Queue"
 "Bastard Shit Bastard"
 "Every Horror Every Day"
 "This Day Is a Spark of Life"
 "Fill My Mouth With Dirt"
 "March on to Victory"
 "Epilogue: Legions of Dead Prepare for War"

Credits
 Matt Fox - guitar
 Matthew Fletcher - bass 
 Ronen Kauffman - vocals
 Eric Dellon - vocals
 Greg Thomas - guitar

2003 EPs
Zombie Apocalypse (band) albums
Indecision Records EPs